Michael A. Campion is the Herman C. Krannert Distinguished Professor of Management at Purdue University (since 1986). Previous industrial experience (1978-1986) includes 4 years each at IBM and Weyerhaeuser Company. He has a MS and PhD in Industrial and Organizational Psychology. He has over 145 articles in scientific and professional journals, and has given nearly 250 presentations at professional meetings, on such topics as employment testing, interviewing, mitigating employment discrimination, job analysis, work and team design, training, turnover, promotion, motivation, and computerized text analysis and artificial intelligence for employment decision making. He has over 27,000 Google Scholar citations, nearly 9,000 Web of Science citations, and he is the second most cited author of over 9,000 authors in textbooks in both I/O Psychology and Human Resource Management. He is past editor of Personnel Psychology  (a scientific research journal) and past president of the Society for Industrial-Organizational Psychology (SIOP). He was promoted to the Herman C. Krannert Chaired Professorship in 2009 and to Distinguished Professor in 2020 for contributions and productivity in scientific research. He is also the 2010 winner of the Scientific Contribution Award given by SIOP, which is the lifetime scientific contribution award and most prestigious award given by SIOP.

References

External links
 Official website at Purdue

Year of birth missing (living people)
Living people
Krannert School of Management faculty
21st-century American psychologists